John Eric George "Jack" Fairman (15 March 1913 – 7 February 2002) was a British racing driver from England. He participated in 13 Formula One Grands Prix, making his debut on 18 July 1953. He scored a total of five championship points, all of which came in the 1956 season.

Career summary
Fairman was born in Horley, and was only an occasional racing driver, his main source of income coming from running the family precision tool manufacturing company. He got his first taste of motorsport before World War II, driving an Alvis 12/50 in trials and hill climb events from 1934. He quickly moved on to races at the Brooklands circuit, but the war intervened and he spent the duration on active service in the Tank Corps.

Postwar, Fairman's reliable and dogged driving attributes saw him achieve many successes in sports car racing, particularly in endurance events. He drove for a number of top-rank teams during this time, including Bristol, Jaguar, Ecurie Ecosse, and Aston Martin. It was with Aston that Fairman won his most significant events, partnering Stirling Moss in the 1959 Nürburgring 1000 km, and Tourist Trophy at Goodwood. He also made a brief Formula One debut at the 1953 British Grand Prix, driving and retiring an HWM 53.

His engineering experience and dependable driving made him an obvious choice for constructors to contact when they needed a test driver. His most significant contribution in this role was during the development of Connaught's Formula Two and later Formula One cars. Between sports car commitments and his own factory, Fairman managed to fit in occasional Formula One starts, usually at the British or Italian Grands Prix. He took a Connaught Type B to two points finishes during the 1956 Formula One season, his only points in a very long Formula One career, finishing tenth in the World Championship that year.

Following Bernie Ecclestone's purchase of the remains of Connaught in 1958, Fairman continued with his sporadic Formula One career in a wide variety of machines. His only notable entry in the years that followed was when he became simultaneously the last man ever to start a Grand Prix with a front engined car and the first to drive a four-wheel drive car, at the 1961 British Grand Prix. The car in question was the experimental Ferguson P99, designed by Ferguson Research Ltd. and run by the Rob Walker Racing Team. Unfortunately for Fairman, his RWR teammate Stirling Moss suffered brake failure in his Lotus 18 and took over the 4WD machine in Fairman's stead. Moss was then later disqualified for receiving a push start, which also ended Fairman's race. Fairman's last Formula One race was in the 1963 non-Championship Imola Grand Prix event, driving a Porsche for Ecurie Maarsbergen.

Fairman died, aged 88, in Rugby, Warwickshire.  The pub chain Wetherspoons has opened a pub named The Jack Fairman in his birthplace of Horley. Opened on 12 February 2007, it occupies the buildings in Victoria Road which originally housed Fairman's garage and has pictures of him around the walls and details can be located on their website. Prior to the pub opening, it was the local Kwik Fit for many years.

Complete Formula One World Championship results
(key)

References

External links
Career synopsis at Autocourse Grand Prix Archive
Career synopsis at gpracing.net
Jack Fairman page at the Jaguar Daimler Heritage Trust

English Formula One drivers
English racing drivers
1913 births
2002 deaths
British Army personnel of World War II
24 Hours of Le Mans drivers
Hersham and Walton Motors Formula One drivers
Connaught Formula One drivers
BRM Formula One drivers
Cooper Formula One drivers
Rob Walker Racing Team Formula One drivers
World Sportscar Championship drivers
People from Horley
Royal Tank Regiment soldiers
12 Hours of Reims drivers
Ecurie Ecosse drivers